St. Peter's Church in Birstall, West Yorkshire, England is an active Anglican parish church in the archdeaconry of Leeds and the Diocese of Leeds.

History
The church has Norman origins being founded in 1100 by Radulphus de Paganell, the tower is the only part surviving from that era; its first two stages were built in the 12th century. The tower was raised in the 15th century and a major refurbishment was carried out between 1863 and 1870 by W.H. Crossland of Leeds.  The church was grade II* listed on 29 March 1963.  Between 1997 and 2000 a screen was built to separate the first bay of the nave and aisles to create meeting rooms.

Architectural style

Exterior
The tower has three stages, its first two are of Norman origin with diagonal buttresses and stout corner pinnacles which were added in the 15th century, the second stage has narrow windows and a round clock on the western face while the south face has a sundial dating from 1660.  The chancel has diagonal buttresses.  The chancel incorporates a chapel on its north side and a vestry and organ chamber on its south.

Interior
The nave has four bays with arcades with octagonal piers.  The tower has a stepped round arch dating from around 1100.  The outer aisles have seven bay arcades on quatrefoil piers.  The chancel has three bays.  The nave and inner aisles have plastered walls while the outer aisles and chancel have exposed stone walls.  The south aisle has a flagstone floor, the chancel a tiled floor while the aisle chapel has a mosaic floor.

Fixtures
An early-20th century painting of Christ in Glory by Reginald Frampton is on the east wall. The octagonal font has a panelled bowl and stem which dates from the 15th century. It had been discarded in 1771 but reinstated in 1841. The pulpit is made of stone construction and has a wrought-iron balustrade. The pews date from around 1870 and have roundels to the top. The reredos depicts the Last Supper.

References

External links

St. Peter's Church, Birstall

Birstall, West Yorkshire
Anglican Diocese of Leeds
Church of England church buildings in West Yorkshire
Grade II* listed churches in West Yorkshire
William Henry Crossland buildings